Vyakhirev or Viakhirev is a Russian masculine surname, its feminine counterpart is Vyakhireva or Viakhireva. It may refer to
 Anna Vyakhireva (born 1995), Russian handball player
 Polina Kuznetsova (born Vyakhireva in 1987), Russian handball player, sister of Anna
Rem Viakhirev (1934–2013), Russian businessman

Russian-language surnames